Cybernetics in the Soviet Union had its own particular characteristics, as the study of cybernetics came into contact with the dominant scientific ideologies of the Soviet Union and the nation's economic and political reforms: from the unmitigated anti-Americanist criticism of cybernetics in the early 1950s; its legitimization after Stalin's death and up to 1961; its total saturation of Soviet academia in the 1960s; and its eventual decline through the 1970s and 1980s.

Initially, from 1950 until 54, the reception of cybernetics by the Soviet Union establishment was exclusively negative. The Soviet Department for Agitation and Propaganda had called for anti-Americanism to be intensified in Soviet media, and in an attempt to fill the Department's quotas, Soviet journalists latched on to cybernetics as an American "reactionary pseudoscience" to denounce and mock. This attack was interpreted as a signal of an official attitude to cybernetics, so, under Joseph Stalin's premiership, cybernetics was inflated into "a full embodiment of imperialist ideology" by Soviet writers. Upon Stalin's death, the wide-reaching reforms of Nikita Khrushchev's premiership allowed cybernetics to legitimize itself as "a serious, important science", and in 1955, articles on cybernetics were published in the state philosophical organ, Voprosy Filosofii, after a group of Soviet scientists realized the potential of this new science.

Under the formerly suppressive scientific culture of the Soviet Union, cybernetics began to serve as an umbrella term for previously maligned areas of Soviet science, such as structural linguistics and genetics. Under the leadership of academician Aksel Berg, the Council of Cybernetics was formed, an umbrella organization dedicated to providing funding for these new lights of Soviet science. By the 1960s, this fast legitimization put cybernetics in fashion, as "cybernetics" became a buzzword among career-minded scientists. Additionally, Berg's administration left many of the original cyberneticians of the organization disgruntled; complaints were made that he seemed more focused on administration than scientific research, citing Berg's grand plans to expand the council to subsume "practically all of Soviet science". By the 1980s, cybernetics had lost relevance in Soviet scientific culture, as its terminology and political function were succeeded by those of informatics in the Soviet Union and, eventually, post-Soviet states.

Official criticism: 1950–1954

The initial reception of cybernetics in the stifling scientific culture of Soviet state-sanctioned media and academic publication was exclusively negative. Under the plans of the Soviet Department for Agitation and Propaganda, Soviet anti-American propaganda was to be intensified, in order "to show the decay of bourgeois culture and morals" and "debunk the myths of American propaganda" in the wake of the formation of NATO. This imperative put Soviet newspaper editors in a frantic search for topics to criticize, in order to fill these propagandistic quotas.

The first to latch onto Cybernetics was science journalist, Boris Agapov, following the post-war American interest in the developments in computer technology. The cover of the January 23, 1950, issue of Time had boasted an anthropomorphic cartoon of a Harvard Mark III under the slogan "Can Man Build a Superman?". On 4 May 1950, Agapov published an article in the Literaturnaya Gazeta entitled "Mark III, a Calculator", ridiculing this American excitement at the "sweet dream" of the military and industrial uses of these new "thinking machines", and criticizing Wiener as an example of the "charlatans and obscurantists, whom capitalists substitute for genuine scientists".

Though it was not commissioned by any Soviet authority and never mentioned the science by name, Agapov's article was taken as a signal of an official critical attitude towards cybernetics; editions of Norbert Wiener's Cybernetics were removed from library circulation, and several other periodicals followed suit, denouncing cybernetics as a "reactionary pseudoscience". In 1951, of the Institute of Philosophy, led a public campaign against the philosophy of "semantic idealism", characterizing Wiener, and cybernetics as a whole, as a part of this "reactionary philosophy". In 1952, another more explicitly anti-cybernetic article was published in the Literaturnaya Gazeta, definitively starting the campaign and leading the way for a flurry of popular titles denouncing the topic. At the zenith of this criticism, an article in the October 1953 issue of the state ideological organ, Voprosy Filosofii, was published under the pseudonym "Materialist", entitled "Whom Does Cybernetics Serve?"; it condemned cybernetics as a "misanthropic pseudo-theory" consisting of "mechanicism turning into idealism", pointing to the American military as the "god whom cybernetics served".

During this period, Stalin himself never engaged in this rabid criticism of cybernetics, with the head of the Soviet Department of Sciences, Iurii Zhdanov, recalling that "he never opposed cybernetics" and made every effort "to advance computer technology" in order to give the USSR the technological advantage. Though the scale of this campaign was modest, with only around 10 anti-cybernetic publications being produced, Valery Shilov has argued it constituted a "strict directive to action" from the "central ideological organs", a universal declaration of cybernetics as a bourgeois pseudoscience to be criticized and destroyed.

Few of these critics had any access to primary sources on cybernetics. Agapov's sources were limited to the January 1950 issue of Time; the Institute's criticisms were based on the 1949 volume of ETC: A Review of General Semantics; and, among Soviet articles on cybernetics, only the "Materialist" quoted Wiener's Cybernetics directly. Select sensational quotes of Wiener and speculations based "exclusively on the basis of other [Soviet] books already written on the same or similar subject", were used to characterize Wiener as both an idealist and a mechanicist, criticizing his supposed reduction of scientific and sociological ideas to mere "mechanical model[s]". Wiener's gloomy speculations on the "second industrial revolution" and the "assembly line without human agents" were distorted to brand him as a "technocrat", wishing for "the process of production realized without workers, only with machines controlled by the gigantic brain of the computer" with "no strikes or strike movements, and moreover no revolutionary insurrections". According to Slava Gerovitch, "each critic carried criticism one step further, gradually inflating the significance of cybernetics until it was seen as a full embodiment of imperialist ideology".

Legitimization and rise: 1954–1961

The reformed academic culture of the Soviet Union, after the death of Stalin and reforms of the Khrushchev era, allowed cybernetics to tear down its previous ideological criticisms and redeem itself in the public view. To Soviet scientists, cybernetics emerged as a possible vector of escape from the ideological traps of Stalinism, replacing it with the computational objectivity of cybernetics.

Military computer scientist Anatoly Kitov recalled stumbling onto Cybernetics in the secret library of the Special Construction Bureau and realizing instantly that "cybernetics was not a bourgeois pseudo-science, as official publications considered it at the time, but the opposite—a serious, important science". He joined with the dissident mathematician Alexey Lyapunov, and, in 1952, presented a pro-cybernetic paper to Voprosy Filosofii, which the journal tacitly endorsed, though the Communist Party required that Lyapunov and Kitov present public lectures on cybernetics before its publication, with 121 seminars produced in total from 1954 until 55.

A very different academic, the Soviet philosopher and former ideological watchdog Ernst Kolman, also joined this rehabilitation. In November 1954, Kolman presented a lecture at the Academy of Social Sciences, condemning this stifling of cybernetics to a shocked audience, who had expected a lecture rehearsing previous Stalinist criticisms, and marched down to the office of Voprosy Filosofii to have his lecture published.

The beginning of a Soviet cybernetic movement was therefore first signalled by two articles, published together in the July–August 1955 volume of Voprosy Filosofii: "The Main Features of Cybernetics" by Sergei Sobolev, Alexey Lyapunov, and Anatoly Kitov, and "What is Cybernetics" by Ernst Kolman. According to Benjamin Peters, these "two Soviet articles set the stage for the revolution of cybernetics in the Soviet Union".

The first article—authored by three Soviet military scientists—attempted to present the tenets of cybernetics as a coherent scientific theory, retooling it for Soviet use; they purposely avoided any discussion of philosophy, and presented Wiener as an American anti-capitalist, in order to avoid any politically dangerous confrontation. They asserted cybernetics' main tenets as:
 information theory,
 the theory of automatic high-speed electronic calculating machines as a theory of self-organizing logical processes,
 the theory of automatic control systems (particularly, the theory of feedback).

In juxtaposition, Kolman's defense of cybernetics mirrored the Stalinist criticisms it had endured. Kolman created a spurious historiography of cybernetics (which inevitably found its origins in Soviet science) and corrected the supposed "deviations" of the anti-cybernetic philosophers, employing well-placed quotes from Marxist authorities and philosophical epithets (e.g. "idealist" or "vitalist"), implying cybernetics' opponents fell into the same philosophical errors Marx and Lenin had criticized decades earlier, within their dialectical materialist framework.

With this, Soviet cybernetics began its journey towards legitimization. Academician Aksel Berg, at the time Deputy Minister of Defense, authored secret reports beleaguering the deficient state of information science in the USSR, pointing towards the suppression of cybernetics as the prime culprit. Party officials allowed a small Soviet delegation to be sent to the First International Congress on Cybernetics in June 1956, and they informed the Party of the extent to which USSR was "lagging behind the developed countries" in computer technology. Unfavorable descriptions of cybernetics were removed from official literature, and in 1958, the first Russian translations of Wiener were published.

The publishing of the first Soviet journal on cybernetics, Проблемы кибернетики [Problems of Cybernetics], was launched with Lyapunov as its editor. For the 1960 First International Federation of Automatic Control, Wiener came to Russia to lecture on cybernetics at the Polytechnic Museum. He arrived to see the booked hall swarmed with scientists eager to hear his lecture, some of whom sat on aisles and stairs to hear him speak; several Soviet publications, including the formerly anti-cybernetic Voprosy Filosofii, crammed in to get interviews from Wiener. In the Krushchev Thaw, Soviet cybernetics had not only been legitimized as a science, but had entered the vogue in Soviet academia.

On 10 April 1959, Berg sent a report edited by Lyapunov to a presidium of the Academy of Sciences, recommending the establishment of an organization dedicated to advancing cybernetics. The presidium determined that the Council on Cybernetics would be formed, with Berg as the chairman (due to his strong administrative connections) and Lyapunov his deputy. This council was wide-reaching, subsuming as many as 15 disciplines as of 1967, from "cybernetic linguistics" to "legal cybernetics". During Khrushchev's relaxation of scientific culture, the Council on Cybernetics served as an umbrella organization for formerly suppressed research, including such subjects as non-Pavlovian physiology ("physiological cybernetics"), structural linguistics ("cybernetic linguistics"), and genetics ("biological cybernetics").

Thanks to Lyapunov, a further, 20-person Department of Cybernetics was created to solicit official funding for cybernetic research. Even with these institutions, Lyapunov still lamented that "the field of cybernetics in our country is not organized", and, from 1960–61, worked with the Department to establish an official Institute of Cybernetics. Lyapunov joined forces with the structural linguists, who had been authorized to create the Institute of Semiotics directed by Andrey Markov Jr., and, in June 1961, together planned to create an Institute of Cybernetics. Despite these efforts, Lyapunov lost faith in the project after Krushchev's refusal to build more Moscow scientific institutes, and the Institute never emerged, settling with the Council of Cybernetics instead gaining the formal powers of an institute, without any expansion of staff.

Peak and decline: 1961–1980s

Berg continued with his campaign for Soviet cybernetics into the 1960s, as cybernetics entered the Soviet mainstream. Berg's council sponsored pro-cybernetic programs in Soviet media. 20-minute radio broadcasts, entitled "Cybernetics in Our Lives", were produced; a series of broadcasts on Moscow TV detailed advances in computer technology; and hundreds of lectures were given before various party members and workers on the subject of cybernetics. In 1961, the council produced an official volume proffering cybernetics as a socialist science: entitled Cybernetics—in the Service of Communism.

The work of the council was rewarded when, at the 22nd Party Congress, cybernetics was declared one of the "major tools of the creation of a communist society". Khrushchev declared the development of cybernetics an "imperative" in Soviet science. According to Gerovitch, this put cybernetics "in fashion" as "many career-minded scientists began using 'cybernetics' as a buzzword" and the movement swelled with its new membership. The CIA reported that the July 1962 'Conference on the Philosophical Problems of Cybernetics' received "approximately 1000 specialists, mathematicians, philosophers, physicists, economists, psychologists, biologists, engineers, linguists, physicians".

In July 1962, Berg created a plan for the radical restructuring of the Council such that it covered "practically all of Soviet science". This was met with cold reception from many of the researchers of the Council, with one cybernetician complaining, in a letter to Lyapunov, that "[t]here are almost no results from the Council. Berg only demands paperwork and strives for the expansion of the Council." Lyapunov, disgruntled with Berg and the non-academic direction of cybernetics, refused to write for Cybernetics—in the Service of Communism and gradually lost his influence in cybernetics. As one memoirist put it, this resignation meant that "the center that had unified cybernetics disappeared, and cybernetics [would] naturally split into numerous branches." While the old guard of cyberneticians complained, the cybernetics movement, as a whole, was exploding; with the council subsuming 170 projects and 29 institutions by 1962, and 500 projects and 150 institutions by 1967.

According to Gerovitch, "by the early 1970s, the cybernetics movement [...] no longer challenged the orthodoxy; instead, tactical uses of cyberspeak overshadowed the original reformist goals that aspired the first Soviet cyberneticians." The ideas which were once seen as controversial, and huddled under the umbrella organization of cybernetics, now entered the scientific mainstream, leaving cybernetics as a loose and incoherent ideological patchwork. Some cyberneticians, whose dissident styles had been sheltered by the cybernetics movement, now felt persecuted, and some, such as Valentin Turchin, Alexander Lerner, and Igor Mel'čuk emigrated to escape this newfound scientific atmosphere. By the 1980s, cybernetics had lost its cultural relevance, being replaced in Soviet scientific culture with the concepts of 'informatics'.

Notable Soviet cyberneticists

 Aksel Berg (1893–1979) Deputy Minister of Defense of the Soviet Union (September 1953–November 1957)
 Yuri Gastev (1928–1993) dissident who emigrated in 1981
 Victor Glushkov (1923–1982) Soviet mathematician and founding father of Soviet cybernetics
 Anatoly Kitov (1920–2005)
 Andrey Kolmogorov (1903-1987)
 Leonid Kraizmer (1912–2002)
 Alexey Lyapunov (1911–1973)
 Sergei Sobolev (1908–1989)

Notes

References

Bibliography

External link

Cybernetics
Science and technology in the Soviet Union
Computing in the Soviet Union